Zurabi Iakobishvili (born February 4, 1992) is a Georgian freestyle wrestler. He won a gold medal at the 2017 World Wrestling Championships. He won a bronze medal at the 2017 European Wrestling Championships. He competed in the men's freestyle 65 kg event at the 2016 Summer Olympics, in which he was eliminated in the quarterfinals by Frank Chamizo.

In 2021, he won one of the bronze medals in the men's 70 kg event at the World Wrestling Championships held in Oslo, Norway. In 2022, he won one of the bronze medals in his event at the Yasar Dogu Tournament held in Istanbul, Turkey. He won one of the bronze medals in the men's 70kg event at the 2022 World Wrestling Championships held in Belgrade, Serbia.

References

External links
 

1992 births
Living people
People from Kakheti
Male sport wrestlers from Georgia (country)
Olympic wrestlers of Georgia (country)
Wrestlers at the 2016 Summer Olympics
World Wrestling Championships medalists
European Wrestling Champions
21st-century people from Georgia (country)